Atlas is a name for a family of modern inline piston engines for trucks from General Motors, used in the GMT355 and GMT360 platforms. The series debuted in 2002 with the Oldsmobile Bravada, and is also used in the Buick Rainier, the Chevrolet TrailBlazer and Colorado, the GMC Envoy and Canyon, the Hummer H3, Isuzu Ascender and i-370, and the Saab 9-7X. The engines use GM's Vortec name, and Straight-4, Straight-5, and Straight-6 engines are all part of the same family, sharing the same manufacturing equipment, rods, pistons, valves, and other parts. They feature coil-on-plug ignition systems, variable valve timing on the exhaust side, electronic throttle control, and a special oil pan with a pass-through for the half shafts in four-wheel drive vehicles. The inclusion of VVT on the exhaust camshaft side allows the Atlas series to meet emissions standards without the use of EGR, simplifying the engine design and increasing power for a broad power curve. The LL8 shares 75% of its components with the LK5 and L52; while the LK5 and L52 share 89% of their components.

The Atlas engines feature aluminum cylinder blocks and heads, with the cylinder bores featuring replaceable steel cylinder liners.

The Atlas program began in 1995 along with the planning for GM's next-generation mid-size SUVs and pickup trucks. These vehicles were designed around the I6 engine. The I6 version was used in a Baja 1000 racing truck, winning its first race in a class that also included V8 engines. Another I6-powered truck won the truck class at the Pikes Peak International Hillclimb.

The Atlas engines were produced at the Flint Engine South plant in Flint, Michigan, while the I4 and I5 versions were produced at the Tonawanda Engine plant in Tonawanda, New York, near Buffalo.

LL8 (Vortec 4200) 

The LL8 (or Vortec 4200), is a straight-6 gasoline engine produced from 2002 to 2009. It was the first Atlas engine, and was introduced in 2002 for the Chevrolet TrailBlazer, GMC Envoy, and Oldsmobile Bravada. The engine was also used in the Buick Rainier, Saab 9-7X, and Isuzu Ascender.

It displaces , with a  bore and stroke. It has four valves per cylinder, utilizes dual-overhead cams (DOHC) design, and features variable valve timing on the exhaust cam, a first for GM inline engines. The engine redline is 6,300 rpm. The LL8 was on the Ward's 10 Best Engines list for 2002 through 2005 and was the basis for all the other Atlas engines. With the closure of the Moraine, Ohio, plant and the discontinuation of the GMT360 platform (Chevrolet TrailBlazer, GMC Envoy, etc.), production of the LL8 also ended.

Applications:
 2002–2009 GMC Envoy, Envoy XL, and Envoy XUV
 2002–2009 Chevrolet TrailBlazer and TrailBlazer EXT
 2002–2004 Oldsmobile Bravada
 2004–2007 Buick Rainier
 2003–2008 Isuzu Ascender
 2005–2009 Saab 9-7X 4.2i

L52 (Vortec 3500) 

The L52 (also called Vortec 3500), is a straight-5 DOHC engine produced from 2004 through 2006. It displaces , with a  bore and stroke. The engine redline is 6,300 rpm.

Applications:

 2002 Bel Air concept
 2004–2006 Chevrolet Colorado and GMC Canyon
 2006 Isuzu i-350
 2006 Hummer H3

LLR (Vortec 3700)

The LLR (also called Vortec 3700), is a straight-5 DOHC engine with dual balance shafts produced from 2007 through 2012. It displaces , courtesy of a larger  bore while keeping the  stroke. The LLR also corrected the head issue found in the L52. The engine redline is 6,300 rpm. This five-cylinder engine achieves better fuel economy and performance than the six-cylinder, but with more power and torque than the four-cylinder.

Applications:
 2007–2012 Chevrolet Colorado and GMC Canyon
 2007–2010 Hummer H3
 2007–2008 Isuzu i-370

LK5 (Vortec 2800) 

The LK5 (also called the Vortec 2800) is a  straight-4 DOHC engine produced between 2004 and 2006, with a  bore and stroke. The engine redline is 6,300 rpm.

Applications:
 2004–2006 Chevrolet Colorado and GMC Canyon
 2004–2006 Isuzu i-280

LLV (Vortec 2900) 

The LLV (also called Vortec 2900) is a  straight-4 DOHC engine produced between 2007 and 2012, with a  bore and a stroke. The engine redline is 6,300 rpm.

Applications:
 2007–2012 Chevrolet Colorado and GMC Canyon
 2007–2009 Isuzu i-290

References

External links 

Atlas
Straight-four engines
Straight-five engines
Straight-six engines
Gasoline engines by model